Baseball Nova Scotia is the provincial governing body for baseball in Nova Scotia.

References

Baseball governing bodies in Canada